Chemistry Is What We Are is the debut album by Simian. It was released on 9 July 2001 on Source Records in the UK and on 18 September 2001 on Astralwerks (with two bonus tracks) in the US.

Track listing
"Drop and Roll" – 6:25
"The Wisp" – 4:15
"Doba" – 5:14
"You Set Off My Brain" – 4:21
"How Could I Be Right" – 1:42
"One Dimension" – 4:48
"Tree in a Corner" – 2:11
"Orange Glow" – 3:44
"Mr. Crow" – 2:48
"Round and Around" – 4:12
"Chamber" – 3:49
"The Tale of Willow Hill" – 3:37 (US bonus track)
"Grey" – 3:57 (US bonus track)

Personnel

Simian
Simon William Lord - vocals, electric/acoustic guitar, keyboards, drum programming
Alex MacNaghten - bass, backing vocals
James Anthony Shaw -  keyboards, drum programming, percussion
James Ford - drums, drum programming

Other personnel
 Nilesh Patel - mastering
 Mat Maitland - design, art direction 
 Thomas Grünfeld - artwork 
 Jason Evans - photography

References

External links

2001 debut albums
Simian (band) albums
Albums produced by James Ford (musician)